The Cook Islands competed at the 2015 Pacific Games in Port Moresby, Papua New Guinea from 4 to 18 July 2015. A total of 132 competitors for the Cook Islands were listed as of 4 July 2015.

Athletics

Women
 Patricia Nooroa Taea
 Tereapii O Jean Ki Nz Tapoki

Beach volleyball

Men
 Brendon Manatu Kainuku Heath
 Daniel Trevor Heath

Bodybuilding

Cricket

Cook Islands qualified a women's team in cricket (13 players):

Women
Women's tournament.

 Erica Myra Jancey Lacynthia Rani
 June Ura Pori Makea George
 Maloku Mataora
 Marii Kaukura
 Metuavaine Benedicta Matapo
 Mirioni Ngametua
 Mummy Raupa Elikana
 Phillica Prisnia Uraiata Tesannra Maruariki
 Punanga Kaveao
 Salaberga Okirua Matapo
 Tereakama Daena Kataina
 Terito Ine
 Tina Turua Mato

Football

Women
 Jennifer Kaiwala Andrea Akavi
 Helen Gloria Ngauora
 Tuakana Moeroa Noovao
 Mii Yvonne Piri
 Tepaeru Helen Toka
 Marjorie Katrina Ngatupuna Toru
 Josephine Clark Turepu
 Tekura Scholastica Urarii
 Maeva Judith Carr
 Elizabeth Poea Harmon
 Moeroa Harmon
 Marissa Alexis Elanor Moira Iroa
 Tekura Kaukura
 Elise Tipani Alexandra Mamanu-Gray
 Upokotea Diane Manuela
 Lee Maoate-Cox

Golf

 William Howard
 Royle Brogan
 Kirk Tuaiti
 Daniel Webb
 Priscilla Viking
 Memory Akama
 Rotana Howard
 Rowena Newbigging

Lawn bowls

Netball

Outrigger canoeing

Rugby league nines

Sailing

 - Men's Laser team
 Taua Henry
 Joshua Ioane

 - Women's Laser Radial team
 Helema Williams
 Teau McKenzie

Women's Laser Radial single
 Helema Williams
 Teau McKenzie

Touch rugby

Cook Islands qualified men's and women's teams in touch rugby (28 athletes):

Women
 – Women's tournament.
 Julieanne Westrupp
 Hemilda Tereapii Vavia
 Edith Nicholas
 Rangitauratua Vicki Apera
 Taromi Teremoana Urirau
 Ngapare Kura Noovao
 Princess Mary Adams
 Ngapoko Parau Joan Kamana
 Sunielia Karen Cherina Tom
 Rima'Ati Moekaa
 Teiti-O-Te-Ra Tupuna
 Dayna Victoria Napa
 Matatai Jandawn Taia
 Lou-Ani Marie Alexander Marsters

Men
 – Men's tournament.
 Kapi Andrew Andrew Anguna
 Rangi-Te-Au-O-Tepuretu Desmond Piri
 Cahjun Sean-Colin Tamatoa Harry Willis
 Harmas Jason Potoru
 Teava Pakari Terangi
 Hugh Jerome Tangaroa Henry
 Benjamin John Heather
 Ngatupuna Hiro Joseph
 Mokopuna Grandson Nooroa
 Setephano Noovao
 Apii College Rau
 Matamanea Christopher Andrew Matapakia
 Kristopher Ru Tetokorangi Williamson
 Heimona Thomas Potoru

Weightlifting

References

2015 in Cook Islands sport
Nations at the 2015 Pacific Games
Cook Islands at the Pacific Games